EyeToy: Groove is a dancing game developed by London Studio and published by Sony Computer Entertainment. It was released on November 14, 2003 in Europe, on April 20, 2004 in North America, and on June 24, 2004 in Japan as EyeToy: FuriFuri Dance Tengoku. In EyeToy: Groove the player must hit targets with their arms on the edges of the screen to the beat of the music.

The game also includes a built-in calorie counter which estimates calories burned based on the player's weight. Players can usually burn around 5-20 calories per song. There are rewards available for high amounts of calories burned. There is also a mode that allows players to design their own moves for the songs.

Gameplay
Building on from the 'Beat Freak' mode from EyeToy: Play, players must hit targets on the edges of the screen with their arms in time to the music. There will sometimes be stars that require players to follow it from one position to the other. There are also freestyle segments in which players earn points by freely moving about on screen.

Music
There are 28 songs from several different artists including The Cheeky Girls, Daniel Bedingfield, Mis-Teeq, Earth, Wind & Fire, 5ive, Elvis Presley, Fatboy Slim, Groove Armada, Good Charlotte, Jessica Simpson, Sugababes, Las Ketchup, Madonna, and Village People.

Reception

The game received "average" reviews according to the review aggregation website Metacritic.  In Japan, Famitsu gave it a score of one seven, one five, and two sixes for a total of 24 out of 40.

See also
 Dance pad

References

External links

2003 video games
Dance video games
EyeToy games
London Studio games
Multiplayer and single-player video games
Music video games
PlayStation 2 games
PlayStation 2-only games
Sony Interactive Entertainment games
Video games developed in the United Kingdom